Æolus, also spelt Aeolus (or frequently Eolus),  was a snow sailing ship built in 1783 at Åbenrå in Denmark as a West Indiaman. The British Royal Navy captured her in 1807. Buckle & Co. purchased her as a prize. In 1808-9 she transported convicts to Port Jackson, New South Wales. She was last listed in Lloyd's Register in 1816.

Career
Æolus was built for general merchant Mr. Butz of Butz & Partners for use as a West Indiaman. She was still owned by this partnership in 1807 before capture by the British.

She enters Lloyd's Register in 1808, where she is shown with Cooper, master.

Under the command of Robert Addie, she sailed from England in 1808 and arrived at Port Jackson on 26 January 1809. She had embarked 79 female convicts, none of whom died on the voyage.  Most of the convicts were then sent to the Parramatta Female Factory.

Æolus left Port Jackson on 1 April bound for England. She was carrying a full load of whale oil from the whaler , which had been condemned by survey at Hobart.

Æolus, E. Sindry, master, was still sailing in 1813. She had to put into Corunna in distress on her way from London to Bermuda. She discharged her cargo at Corunna.

The Register of Shipping for 1814 showed her with Sunday, master, Boyd & Co., owner, and trade London–Bermuda.

Fate
The Register of Shipping last listed her in 1816; Lloyd's Register last listed her in 1815.

Notes, citations, and references
Notes

Citations

References
 

1783 ships
Ships built in Denmark
Convict ships to New South Wales
Whaling in Australia
Age of Sail merchant ships
Merchant ships of the United Kingdom
Ships designed by Henrik Gerner